Ashill is a small hamlet in west Cornwall, England, United Kingdom in the valley of the Red River about 2 miles north west of Camborne. The Red River Nature reserve lies east of the hamlet.

References

Hamlets in Cornwall